Rafał Sylwester Wiechecki (born 25 September 1978 in Piotrków Trybunalski) is a Polish politician. He was elected to the Sejm on 25 September 2005, getting 6,058 votes in the 41st Szczecin district, running on the League of Polish Families list. He also started cooperation with various other newspapers, including Myśl Polska, Wszechpolak (2002-2004) and Myśl.pl (since 2006).

He was the youngest cabinet minister in Polish history.

See also
Members of Polish Sejm 2005-2007

External links
 http://www.wiechecki.pl/ 
Rafał Wiechecki - parliamentary page - includes declarations of interest, voting record, and transcripts of speeches.

1978 births
Living people
People from Piotrków Trybunalski
Members of the Polish Sejm 2005–2007
League of Polish Families politicians